Sir James Johnstone, 3rd Baronet (9 February 1697 – 10 December 1772) was a Scottish baronet and politician. He sat in the  House of Commons of Great Britain from 1743 to 1754.

Sir James was the son of Sir William Johnstone, 2nd Baronet. In 1719 he married Barbara Murray, daughter of Alexander Murray, 4th Lord Elibank. They had 14 children: 8 sons and 6 daughters. Johnstone succeeded to his father's baronetcy in 1727.

He was the MP for Dumfries Burghs from 1743 to 1754.

He was succeeded in the baronetcy by his son James (1726–1794), who became MP for Dumfries Burghs and then for Weymouth.

References 
 

1697 births
1772 deaths
Baronets in the Baronetage of Nova Scotia
Members of the Parliament of Great Britain for Scottish constituencies
British MPs 1741–1747
British MPs 1747–1754